Desert Storm is a double looping roller coaster located at Castles N' Coasters, an amusement park in Phoenix, Arizona. It is one of the two roller coasters there, the other being the smaller Patriot roller coaster.  Desert Storm passes over top of the Li'l Indy go-cart track and extremely close to Splashdown, the park's log flume.  The track has a green and white color scheme and the queue line passes by the Flying Bugs and Spinning Tops kiddie rides, climbs stairs and enters the boarding area.

Desert Storm is also briefly featured in the Macgillivray Freeman film Dream Big.

Track layout
After boarding the train, it moves forward and begins going up the hill.  At the top, it takes a narrow turn and takes a steep dive, does its first loop, makes a wide turn, does its second loop, does a 360 degree turn that interlocks with the second loop, makes a wide turn and does another 360 degree turn, takes another large drop as it makes a last wide turn, and returns to the station.

Technical information
The roller coaster has one train that has seven cars, each car with two rows of two seats, four seats per car, and in all seats twenty-eight people per ride. It has a chain lift hill and lap bar restraint.

Ride elements
 Two loops
 Two 360 degree turns
 Second loop interlocks with first 360 degree turn
 Narrowly dodges the Splashdown log

See also
 Castles N' Coasters

References
 Castles N' Coasters Official Home Page

External links
 Castles N' Coasters Official Website